Fresh Healthy Vending is a vending machine company located in San Diego, California specializing in healthy alternatives to traditional vending machine snack foods and beverages. It was founded in June 2010. The company's refrigerated machines offer carrots, yogurt, smoothies, granola bars and beverages such as milk, juice and teas.

The company states that it sells only organic, natural and healthy foods and drinks, and the branded vending machines appear largely in schools, hospitals, health clubs and community organizations. As of 2011, the company had more than 2,000 vending machines in place around the country; about three-quarters of them are in schools. The company operates under a franchise model.

Fresh Healthy Vending has been active in providing healthy vending products to schools, as encouraged by the Healthy, Hunger-Free Kids Act of 2010, which placed a prohibition on high-calorie junk food in school vending machines.

In 2010 Fresh Healthy Vending became a publicly traded company trading under the stock symbol VEND. Fresh Healthy Vending was nominated by both Entrepreneur and Inc magazine.

In 2015 Fresh Healthy Vending changed its name to Generation Next Franchise Brands and in the same year launched Reis and Irvy’s Frozen Yogurt Robot Vending Franchise.

In 2019 launched a corporate owned fund to operate the frozen yogurt vending robots in 2019.

Legal and Regulatory Complaints Against Fresh Healthy Vending
In 2013, the California Corporations Commission filed action against Fresh Healthy Vending, Inc. found Fresh Healthy Vending to have "committed multiple violations of the California Franchise Investment Law."  The company is currently not permitted to market or sell franchises in California, and is limited to operating locations under its direct control and ownership.

In March 2016 the company was reported to the Securities Exchange commission for allegedly hiring spammers to distribute material promoting the company to large numbers of individuals in an effort to increase stock prices.

Fresh Healthy Vending declared bankruptcy on September 27, 2018.

References

External links
 Company website

Companies based in San Diego
Vending machine manufacturers
Manufacturing companies established in 2010
Franchises
American companies established in 2010